The 1968 Atlanta Braves season was the third season in Atlanta and the 98th overall season of the franchise.  The team went 81–81 in the final season of play before both the American and National Leagues were split into divisions the following season.

Offseason 
 October 6, 1967: Bob Uecker was released by the Braves.
 November 28, 1967: Ramón Hernández was drafted from the Braves by the Chicago Cubs in the 1967 rule 5 draft.
 December 7, 1967: Bobby Cox was traded by the Braves to the New York Yankees for Bob Tillman and Dale Roberts.

Regular season

Season standings

Record vs. opponents

Opening Day lineup

Roster

Player stats

Batting

Starters by position 
Note: Pos = Position; G = Games played; AB = At bats; H = Hits; Avg. = Batting average; HR = Home runs; RBI = Runs batted in

Other batters 
Note: G = Games played; AB = At bats; H = Hits; Avg. = Batting average; HR = Home runs; RBI = Runs batted in

Pitching

Starting pitchers 
Note: G = Games pitched; IP = Innings pitched; W = Wins; L = Losses; ERA = Earned run average; SO = Strikeouts

Other pitchers 
Note: G = Games pitched; IP = Innings pitched; W = Wins; L = Losses; ERA = Earned run average; SO = Strikeouts

Relief pitchers 
Note: G = Games pitched; W = Wins; L = Losses; SV = Saves; ERA = Earned run average; SO = Strikeouts

Farm system 

LEAGUE CHAMPIONS: Greenwood

References

External links
1968 Atlanta Braves season at Baseball Reference

Atlanta Braves seasons
Atlanta Braves season
Atlanta